The Philadelphia Fever were an indoor soccer team based out of Philadelphia that played in the original Major Indoor Soccer League from 1978 to 1982.  Their home arena was the Spectrum.  After being granted a one-year hiatus following the 1981-82 season, the team ultimately folded.  While it is often reported that the Los Angeles Lazers were the relocated Fever, the one-year hiatus was actually granted at the same time as the Lazers were awarded an expansion franchise, during the MISL's August 1982 league meetings.   The four seasons in Philadelphia the Fever average attendance was 5,777 per game.

Yearly Awards
1978–1979 Season
Fred Grgurev – MISL Top Goalscorer, MISL Scoring Champion, MISL Pass Master (most assists) & All-Star Team selection.

Year-by-year

References

External links
  Fever fan page
 1979 MISL
 1980 MISL
 1981 MISL
 1982 MISL

Defunct indoor soccer clubs in the United States
Fever
Major Indoor Soccer League (1978–1992) teams
F
Soccer clubs in Pennsylvania
1978 establishments in Pennsylvania
Culture of Philadelphia